Antoine Saint-John (born 11 August 1940-2 july 1990) (aka Domingo Antoine, Jean-Michel Antoine, Antoine Michel) was a French actor.

Born in Avignon, France, he found work as a stage actor until the early 1970s, when he began working on films. His most famous role was in John Milius's historical epic The Wind and the Lion (1975), where he played a German colonel. He also appeared, playing similar characters, in the Spaghetti Westerns A Fistful of Dynamite (1971) and My Name is Nobody (1973).  He also appeared as the zombified artist Schweick in Lucio Fulci's cult horror film The Beyond (1981). He spoke fluent English and German.

Filmography

External links 

Living people
1940 births
French male film actors
Actors from Avignon
French male stage actors